This is a list of New Hampshire Wildcats football players in the NFL Draft.

Key

Selections 
Note: the first NFL Draft was held in February 1936.

References

New Hampshire

New Hampshire Wildcats NFL Draft